Ralph Q. Welker (March 8, 1911 – September 13, 1981) was a member of the Ohio House of Representatives.

References

Members of the Ohio House of Representatives
1911 births
1981 deaths
20th-century American politicians
People from Pomeroy, Ohio